The Johnny Unitas Golden Arm Award is given annually in the United States to the nation's top upperclassmen quarterback in college football. Candidates are judged on accomplishments on the field as well as on their character, scholastic achievement, and leadership qualities. The award was established in 1987 and named after Johnny Unitas, who was nicknamed "The Golden Arm". Unitas played his college career at the University of Louisville and set many records in the National Football League while playing for the Baltimore Colts.

Winners
These are the award recipients since inception in 1987.

References

External links
Official website

College football national player awards
Awards established in 1987